David Peter Valentin (April 29, 1952 – March 8, 2017) was an American Latin jazz flautist of Puerto Rican descent.

Life and career
Valentin was born to Puerto Rican parents in The Bronx in New York City. He attended The High School of Music & Art. He learned percussion at an early age, and by 10 was playing conga and timbales professionally. When he was 12, he began to practice the flute so he could get to know a girl in school who played the flute, Irene Cathcart. He borrowed a flute, bought a Herbie Mann record, and started to teach himself. Years later, he recorded an album with Mann called Two Amigos. He took lessons from Hubert Laws, who became his mentor.

In the 1970s, Valentin combined Latin music with jazz in bands with Bill O'Connell, Lincoln Goines, Richie Morales, Robby Ameen, Sammy Figueroa, and Giovanni Hidalgo. He was the first musician signed to GRP Records, a label founded by Dave Grusin and Larry Rosen that specialized in smooth jazz, jazz fusion, and jazz-pop. He recorded his debut album with Ricardo Marrero in 1977. Over time he recorded with Noel Pointer, Patti Austin, Lee Ritenour, Chris Connor, David Benoit, Eliane Elias, and Nnenna Freelon. Until 1979, he was a schoolteacher.

For several years Valentin served as musical director for Tito Puente's Golden Latin Jazz All-Stars, and also toured with Manny Oquendo's Conjunto Libre. In 2000, he appeared in the documentary Calle 54 performing with Tito Puente's Orchestra.

For seven years in a row, he was chosen best jazz flautist by readers of Jazziz magazine. In 1985, he received a Grammy Award nomination as best R&B instrumentalist. In 2003, he won a Grammy for Caribbean Jazz Project, an album he did with Dave Samuels.

In March 2012, Valentin had a stroke which left him partially paralyzed and unable to perform. In 2015 he suffered a second stroke, and worked to overcome his disabilities in an extended care facility.

On March 8, 2017, Valentin died from complications of a stroke and Parkinson's disease in the Bronx at the age of 64. His lifelong "special friend", Irene, for whom he learned to play the flute, was at his side when he passed.

Discography
 Legends (GRP, 1978)
 The Hawk (GRP, 1979)
 Land of the Third Eye (GRP, 1980)
 I Got It Right This Time (Arista, 1981)
 Pied Piper (GRP, 1981)
 In Love's Time (Arista/GRP, 1982)
 Flute Juice (GRP, 1983)
 Kalahari (GRP, 1984)
 Jungle Garden (GRP, 1985)
 Light Struck (GRP, 1986)
 Mind Time (GRP, 1987)
 Live at the Blue Note (GRP, 1988)
  Two Amigos (GRP, 1990)
 Musical Portraits (GRP, 1992)
 Red Sun (GRP, 1993)
 Tropic Heat  (GRP, 1994)
 Sunshower (Concord Jazz, 1999)
 Primitive Passions (RMM, 2005)
 World on a String (Highnote, 2005)
 Come Fly With Me (Highnote, 2006)
 Pure Imagination (Highnote, 2011)
With Steve Turre
The Spirits Up Above (HighNote, 2004)

With the GRP All-Star Big Band
 GRP All-Star Big Band (GRP, 1992)

With Scott Cossu
Islands (Windham Hill, 1984)
Switchback (Windham Hill, 1989)
Stained Glass Memories (Windham Hill, 1992)

References

External links

Dave Valentin at Music of Puerto Rico

1952 births
2017 deaths
American jazz flautists
American male musicians
American salsa musicians
American people of Puerto Rican descent
Musicians from the Bronx
The High School of Music & Art alumni
GRP Records artists
Deaths from Parkinson's disease
Neurological disease deaths in New York (state)
Jazz musicians from New York (state)
American male jazz musicians
GRP All-Star Big Band members
The Blackout All-Stars members
HighNote Records artists
CTI Records artists